Never Mind the Full Stops is a British television panel game based on the English language, its idiosyncrasies, and its misuse. It is hosted by the British actor, author and Oscar-winning screenwriter, Julian Fellowes. Each episode lasts 30 minutes. The series was filmed in March 2006 at Channel 4's studios in Horseferry Road, Westminster. It was originally broadcast on BBC Four, and aired on BBC Two from 9 October 2006.

Two teams of two people are faced with various questions and challenges concerning English grammar, spelling and usage. The show is divided into rounds, with themes such as identifying the famous author of a badly spoken sentence (John Prescott was one of those picked on in the first episode) and correcting the punctuation in a written sentence. There is also a quick-fire round with questions such as "What is a malapropism?" Points are awarded throughout the show to determine the winning team.

Each show starts with the host giving a 'difficult-to-spell' word and an example mnemonic to help remember that spelling, and by the end of the show the panellists have to have devised their own. In episode one Julian Fellowes gave the example arithmetic: A Rat In The House Might Eat The Ice Cream; and Ned Sherrin's version (which earned his team the win as the final points were tied) was: As Richard Interred The Head Master Every Tiny Infant Cheered. By the end of series 1, even Julian Fellowes had realized that these so-called mnemonics were invariably harder to remember than the spellings – particularly as they were rarely related to the words in question.

Another round featured a film of someone speaking a very obscure UK dialect (often on the verge of extinction), and the teams would have to try to guess what had been said.

The programme's name is derived from that of the long-running pop music panel game Never Mind the Buzzcocks, which is itself taken from the title of the Sex Pistols album, Never Mind the Bollocks.

Episode list

Series 1

Series 2

External links
 
 

BBC television game shows
2000s British game shows
2006 British television series debuts
2007 British television series endings